Arudan-e Sofla (also Romanized as Ārūdān-e Soflá; also known as Ārūdān) is a village in Asir Rural District, Asir District, Mohr County, Fars Province, Iran. At the 2006 census, its population was 108, in 26 families.

References 

Populated places in Mohr County